Duncan Sinclair (29 January 1869 – 21 June 1951) was a Conservative member of the House of Commons of Canada. He was born in Minto Township, Ontario and became a salesman.

He was first elected to Parliament at the Wellington North riding in the 1925 general election, then re-elected there in 1926. Sinclair was defeated by John Knox Blair of the Liberals in the 1930 federal election. Sinclair made an unsuccessful bid to unseat Knox in the 1935 election.

References

External links
 

1869 births
1951 deaths
Conservative Party of Canada (1867–1942) MPs
Members of the House of Commons of Canada from Ontario
People from Wellington County, Ontario